Tetrix ornata, known generally as the ornate pygmy grasshopper or ornate grouse locust, is a species of pygmy grasshopper in the family Tetrigidae. It is native to North America.

Subspecies
These four subspecies belong to the species Tetrix ornata:
 Tetrix ornata hancocki (Morse, 1899)
 Tetrix ornata insolens Rehn and Grant, 1956
 Tetrix ornata occidua Rehn and Grant, 1956
 Tetrix ornata ornata (Say, 1824)

References

External links

 

ornata
Articles created by Qbugbot
Insects described in 1824